The Brathay is a river of north-west England. Its name comes from Old Norse and means broad river. It rises at a point 1289 feet (393 m) above sea level near the Three Shire Stone at the highest point of Wrynose Pass in the Lake District. Its catchment area includes the northern flanks of Wetherlam, Great Carrs and others of the Furness Fells, as well as a substantial area of the Langdale Fells.

The small stream at the top of Wrynose quickly gathers pace as it descends some 930 feet (283 m) in a distance of about two miles (3.2 km), running roughly 
parallel to, and south of, the Wrynose Pass road. Before flowing into 
Little Langdale Tarn it subsumes Bleamoss Beck, the outflow from Blea Tarn. Little Langdale Tarn is also replenished by the Greenburn Beck. The Brathay drains Little Langdale Tarn at its eastern side. It continues in an easterly direction, over Colwith Force where it falls 40 feet (12 m), before turning north and flowing into the tarn of Elter Water at an elevation of 187 feet (57 m) above sea level. Elter Water is also replenished by the Great Langdale Beck.

The Brathay drains Elter Water and flows for about half a mile (0.8 km) in a south-easterly direction to Skelwith Force where it descends 15 
feet (4.6 m). Passing under the A593 road at Skelwith Bridge, and continues in an easterly direction,  to the hamlet of 
Clappersgate. After another quarter of a mile (400 m) it joins the 
River Rothay close to Croft Lodge south-west of Ambleside before flowing into the northern end of Windermere.

The stretches of the Brathay around Clappersgate and Skelwith Force are popular with canoeists.

For its entire length the River Brathay forms part of the boundary between the 
historic counties of Lancashire and Westmorland. Since local government re-organisation in 1974 the Brathay has been within the administrative county of Cumbria.

The river also gives its name to the Brathay estate where the Brathay Exploration Group is based, just south of its confluence with the River Rothay on the edge of Windermere.

See also

Cunsey Beck
River Leven
Trout Beck

References

External links
 https://www.youtube.com/watch?v=YiAZ1a_JxXY

Brathay, River
Westmorland
1Brathay